Murle may refer to:
the Murle people
the Murle language